This page summarizes projects that propose to bring more than  of new liquid fuel capacity to market with the first production of fuel beginning in 2018.  This is part of the Wikipedia summary of Oil Megaprojects.

Quick links to other years

Detailed list of projects for 2018

References 

Oil megaprojects
Oil fields
Proposed energy projects
2018 in technology